Journey Planet is an Irish-American science fiction fanzine currently edited by James Bacon, Christopher J Garcia and various other co-editors. It has been nominated nine times for the Hugo Award for Best Fanzine, winning in 2015.

Description
Journey Planet began as a Fanzine-in-an-hour program item at the 2008 Eastercon at Heathrow. Bacon and Garcia headed up the item and produced the first version of issue 1. After the convention, Claire Brialey came on-board as editor, and remained through issue 9. Ever since, Garcia and Bacon have teamed with a cadre of co-editors on themed issues.

Editors have included Esther MacCallum-Stewart, Helena Nash, Errick Nunnally, Erin Underwood, Meg Frank, Sara Felix, Emma King, Pete Young, Chuck Serface, Pádraig Ó Méalóid, Michael Carroll, Colin Harris, Alissa McKersie, John Coxon, Anthony Roche, Steven H Silver, Vincent Docherty, Lynda Rucker, Linda Wenzelburger, Aurora Celeste, and others.

The zine has carried material, both written and artistic, from professionals and fans, including Gail Carriger, Maura McHugh, Rian Johnson, Seanan McGuire,  Mary Robinette Kowal, Peter Sagal, Dez Skinn, and many others. It has also run interviews with figures such as Alan Moore, John Scalzi, Mel Ramos, and Neil Gaiman.

Each issue is themed, with most themes being in the realm of science fiction, fandom, or comics. Other topics have included historical personages, such as Richard III, historical moments such as World War I, or authors like Flann O'Brien.

Journey Planet has 9 Hugo nominations for Best Fanzine (receiving the award in 2015), won the European Science Fiction Award twice, the Alfie, and a Nova Award for Best Fanzine.

External links
Journey Planet website
Journey Planet issues

References 

Science fiction magazines published in the United States
Magazines established in 2008
Science fiction magazines established in the 2000s
Magazines published in Ireland
Science fiction fanzines
Online magazines published in the United States